There Will Be Blood is a 2007 American epic period drama film written and directed by Paul Thomas Anderson, loosely based on the 1927 novel Oil! by Upton Sinclair. It stars Daniel Day-Lewis as Daniel Plainview, a silver miner turned oilman on a ruthless quest for wealth during Southern California's oil boom of the late 19th and early 20th centuries. Paul Dano, Kevin J. O'Connor, Ciarán Hinds, and Dillon Freasier co-star.

The film was produced by Ghoulardi Film Company and distributed by Paramount Vantage and Miramax Films. At the 2008 Berlin International Film Festival it won the Silver Bear Award for Best Director and a Special Artistic Contribution Award for Jonny Greenwood's score. It grossed $76.2 million worldwide on a $25 million budget.

There Will Be Blood received acclaim for its cinematography, direction, screenplay, score, and the performances of Day-Lewis and Dano. Day-Lewis won the Academy Award, BAFTA, Golden Globe, Screen Actors Guild, NYFCC and IFTA Best Leading Actor awards for the role. It has been widely regarded by critics as one of the greatest films of the 21st century, and it appeared on many critics' "top ten" lists for 2007, including the American Film Institute, the National Society of Film Critics, the National Board of Review, and the Los Angeles Film Critics Association. At the 80th Academy Awards, the film was nominated for eight Oscars (tying with another Miramax/Paramount Vantage co-production No Country for Old Men).  The nominations included Best Picture, Best Director and Best Adapted Screenplay for Anderson. Along with Day-Lewis' Oscar for Best Actor, Robert Elswit won the award for Best Cinematography.

Plot

In 1898, Daniel Plainview finds silver while prospecting in New Mexico but breaks his leg. Dragging himself from the pit, he takes a sample to an assay office and receives a silver and gold claim. In 1902, he discovers oil near Los Angeles and establishes a drilling company. Following the death of a worker in an accident, Daniel adopts the man's orphaned son. The boy, H.W., becomes his nominal business partner, allowing Daniel to present himself to potential investors as a family man.

In 1911, Daniel is approached by Paul Sunday, a young man who tells him of an oil deposit under his family's property in Little Boston, California. Daniel visits the Sundays' property and meets Paul's identical twin brother Eli, a local preacher. Daniel attempts to purchase the farm from the Sundays at a bargain price under the ruse of using it to hunt quail, but his motives are questioned by Eli who knows the land has drilling potential. In exchange for the property, Eli demands $10,000 for his church. An agreement is made and Daniel acquires all the available land in and around the Sunday property, save for one holdout, William Bandy, after Daniel neglected to negotiate with him.

Eli asks to bless the well before drilling begins; Daniel initially agrees, but refuses to allow it when the time comes. Oil drilling begins and a series of misfortunes occur: an accident kills one worker and a gas blowout deafens H.W. and destroys the drilling infrastructure. Eli blames the disasters on the well not having been blessed. When Eli publicly demands the money still owed to him, Daniel beats and humiliates him. At the dinner table that night, Eli attacks and berates his father for having trusted Daniel.

A man arrives at Daniel's doorstep claiming to be his half-brother, Henry; Daniel hires him. A jealous H.W. sets fire to their house, intending to kill Henry. Daniel sends H.W. to a school for the deaf in San Francisco. A Standard Oil representative offers to buy out Daniel's local interests, but, after a perceived slight, Daniel refuses and instead strikes a deal with Union Oil to build a pipeline to the California coast. However, Bandy's ranch remains an impediment.

Daniel becomes suspicious of Henry and confronts him one night at gunpoint. "Henry" confesses that he was a friend of the real Henry, who died of tuberculosis, and that he had impersonated Henry in the hope that Daniel could give him a job. Enraged, Daniel murders the impostor and buries his body. Daniel drinks heavily and weeps.

The next morning, Daniel is awakened by Bandy, who knows of Daniel's crime and wants him to publicly repent in Eli's church in exchange for an easement for the pipeline running across his land. As part of his baptism, Eli humiliates Daniel and coerces him into confessing that he abandoned his son. Later, while the pipeline is being built, H.W. reunites with Daniel, and Eli leaves Little Boston for missionary work.

In 1927, H.W. marries Mary Sunday, the younger sister of Paul and Eli. Daniel, now extremely wealthy but a raging alcoholic, lives alone in a large mansion. H.W. asks his father to dissolve their partnership so that he can establish his own independent drilling company in Mexico. Daniel angrily mocks H.W.'s deafness before revealing his true origins as a "bastard from a basket". H.W. tells Daniel he is glad that they are not related and walks out; Daniel jeers at H.W. as he departs.

While Daniel, drunk, is in the private bowling alley in his mansion, he is visited by Eli, now a radio preacher. Eli offers to sell Daniel the property rights to the Bandy ranch, since Bandy has recently died. Daniel agrees on condition that Eli denounces his faith and credibility. Eli acquiesces, after which Daniel coldly reveals that the property is now worthless, because his neighboring wells have already drained the same oil reservoir. Desperate, Eli confesses to having lost money in the 1929 stock market crash and having strayed morally. Daniel taunts Eli before chasing him around the bowling alley and killing him with a bowling pin. When his butler appears to ask about the commotion, Daniel announces, "I'm finished."

Cast

Themes and analysis 
Many have seen the film as a commentary on the nature of capitalism and greed, and its inherent national presence in America. Daniel Plainview's "I have a competition in me" speech has been looked upon as key when analyzing the film from this angle.

David Denby of The New Yorker described the film as being about "the driving force of capitalism as it both creates and destroys the future" and goes on to say that "this movie is about the vanishing American frontier. The thrown-together buildings look scraggly and unkempt, the homesteaders are modest, stubborn, and reticent, but, in their undreamed-of future, Wal-Mart is on the way."

Others have noted themes of faith, religion, and family. James Christopher of The Times viewed the film as "a biblical parable about America's failure to square religion and greed."

Production

Development 

After Eric Schlosser finished writing Fast Food Nation, reporters kept asking him about Upton Sinclair. Although he had read Sinclair's book The Jungle, he did not know about his other works or anything about Sinclair himself. He decided to read most of Sinclair's works, and eventually read the novel Oil!, which he loved. Schlosser, who found the book to be exciting and thought it would make a great film, sought out the Sinclair estate and purchased the film rights. He thought that he would try to find a director who was as passionate about the book as he was, but director Paul Thomas Anderson approached him first.

Anderson had been working on a screenplay about two fighting families. He struggled with the script and soon realized it was not working. Homesick, he purchased a copy of Oil! in London, drawn to its cover illustration of a California oilfield. As he read, Anderson became more fascinated with the novel. After contacting Schlosser, he adapted the first 150 pages to a screenplay. He began to get a real sense of where his script was going after making many trips to museums dedicated to early oilmen in Bakersfield. Anderson changed the title from Oil! to There Will Be Blood because he felt "there's not enough of the book to feel like it's a proper adaptation".

He said of writing the screenplay:

Anderson, who had said that he would like to work with Daniel Day-Lewis, wrote the screenplay with Day-Lewis in mind and approached the actor when the script was nearly complete. Anderson had heard that Day-Lewis liked his earlier film Punch-Drunk Love, which gave him the confidence to hand Day-Lewis a copy of the incomplete script. According to Day-Lewis, being asked to do the film was enough to convince him. In an interview with The New York Observer, he elaborated that what drew him to the project was "the understanding that [Anderson] had already entered into that world, [he] wasn't observing it  [he'd] entered into it  and indeed [he'd] populated it with characters who [he] felt had lives of their own".

Anderson said that the line in the final scene, "I drink your milkshake!", was paraphrased from a quote by former Secretary of the Interior and U.S. Senator from New Mexico, Albert Fall, speaking before a Congressional investigation into the 1920s oil-related Teapot Dome scandal. Anderson said he was fascinated "to see that word [milkshake] among all this official testimony and terminology" to explain the complicated process of oil drainage.

In 2013, an independent attempt to locate the statement in Fall's testimony proved unsuccessful—an article published in the Case Western Reserve Law Review suggested that the actual source of the paraphrased quote may instead have been remarks in 2003 by Sen. Pete Domenici of New Mexico during a debate over drilling in the Arctic National Wildlife Refuge. In those remarks, Domenici stated:

According to Joanne Sellar, one of the film's producers, it was a hard film to finance because "the studios didn't think it had the scope of a major picture". It took two years to acquire financing for the film. For the role of Plainview's "son", Anderson looked at people in Los Angeles and New York City, but he realized that they needed someone from Texas who knew how to shoot shotguns and "live in that world". The filmmakers asked around at a school and the principal recommended Dillon Freasier. They did not have him read any scenes and instead talked to him, realizing that he was the perfect person for the role.

To build his character, Day-Lewis started with the voice. Anderson sent him recordings from the late 19th century to 1927 and a copy of the 1948 film The Treasure of the Sierra Madre, including documentaries on its director, John Huston, an important influence on Anderson's film. According to Anderson, he was inspired by the fact that Sierra Madre is "about greed and ambition and paranoia and looking at the worst parts of yourself." While writing the script, he would put the film on before he went to bed at night. To research for the role, Day-Lewis read letters from laborers and studied photographs from the time period. He also read up on oil tycoon Edward Doheny, upon whom Sinclair's book is loosely based.

Filming 
Principal photography began in June 2006 on a ranch in Marfa, Texas, and took three months. Other location shooting took place in Los Angeles. The film was shot using Panavision XL 35 mm cameras outfitted primarily with Panavision C series and high-speed anamorphic lenses. Anderson tried to shoot the script in sequence with most of the sets on the ranch.

Two weeks in, Anderson replaced the actor playing Eli Sunday with Paul Dano, who had originally only been cast in the much smaller role of Paul Sunday, the brother who tipped off Plainview about the oil on the Sunday ranch. A profile of Day-Lewis in The New York Times Magazine suggested that the original actor, Kel O'Neill, had been intimidated by Day-Lewis's intensity and habit of staying in character on and off the set. Anderson, Day-Lewis, and O'Neill all denied this claim, and Day-Lewis stated, "I absolutely don't believe that it was because he was intimidated by me. I happen to believe that—and I hope I'm right." O'Neill ascribed his dismissal to a poor working relationship with Anderson and his growing disinterest in acting.

Anderson first saw Dano in The Ballad of Jack and Rose and thought that he would be perfect to play Paul Sunday, a role he originally envisioned to be a 12- or 13-year-old boy. Dano only had four days to prepare for the much larger role of Eli Sunday, but he researched the time period that the film is set in as well as evangelical preachers. The previous two weeks of scenes with Sunday and Plainview had to be re-shot with Dano instead of O'Neill.

The interior mansion scenes were filmed at the Greystone Mansion in Beverly Hills, the former real-life home of Edward Doheny Jr., a gift from his father, Edward Doheny. Scenes filmed at Greystone involved the careful renovation of the basement's two-lane bowling alley. Anderson said it was "a particular situation, because it was so narrow that there could only be a very limited number of people at any given time, maybe five or six behind the camera and then the two boys." Day-Lewis later broke a rib in a fall during filming.

Anderson dedicated the film to Robert Altman, who died during editing.

Music 

Anderson had been a fan of Radiohead's music and was impressed with Jonny Greenwood's scoring of the film Bodysong. While writing the script for There Will Be Blood, Anderson heard Greenwood's orchestral piece "Popcorn Superhet Receiver," which prompted him to ask Greenwood to work with him. After initially agreeing to score the film, Greenwood had doubts and thought about backing out, but Anderson's reassurance and enthusiasm for the film convinced him to stick with it. Anderson gave Greenwood a copy of the film and three weeks later he came back with two hours of music recorded at Abbey Road Studios in London. Concerning his approach to composing the soundtrack, Greenwood said to Entertainment Weekly:

In December 2008, Greenwood's score was nominated for a Grammy in the category of "Best Score Soundtrack Album for Motion Picture, Television or Other Visual Media" for the 51st Grammy Awards. It features classical music, such as the third movement ("Vivace Non Troppo") of Johannes Brahms's Violin Concerto in D Major and Arvo Pärt's "Fratres" for cello and piano.

Greenwood's score was awarded the Silver Bear for outstanding artistic contribution (music) at the 58th Berlin International Film Festival in 2008.

Release

Critical response 
On review aggregator Rotten Tomatoes, the film has an approval rating of 91% based on 244 reviews, with an average rating of 8.5/10. The website's critical consensus reads, "Widely touted as a masterpiece, this sparse and sprawling epic about the underhanded 'heroes' of capitalism boasts incredible performances by leads Daniel Day-Lewis and Paul Dano, and is director Paul Thomas Anderson's best work to date."
On Metacritic, the film has a weighted average score of 93 out of 100, based on 42 critics, indicating "universal acclaim".

Andrew Sarris called the film "an impressive achievement in its confident expertness in rendering the simulated realities of a bygone time and place, largely with an inspired use of regional amateur actors and extras with all the right moves and sounds." In Premiere, Glenn Kenny praised Day-Lewis's performance: "Once his Plainview takes wing, the relentless focus of the performance makes the character unique." Manohla Dargis wrote, in her review for The New York Times, "the film is above all a consummate work of art, one that transcends the historically fraught context of its making, and its pleasures are unapologetically aesthetic."

Esquire praised Day-Lewis' performance: "what's most fun, albeit in a frightening way, is watching this greedmeister become more and more unhinged as he locks horns with Eli Sunday … both Anderson and Day-Lewis go for broke. But it's a pleasure to be reminded, if only once every four years, that subtlety can be overrated." Richard Schickel in Time praised There Will Be Blood as "one of the most wholly original American movies ever made." Critic Tom Charity, writing about CNN's ten-best films list, calls the film the only "flat-out masterpiece" of 2007.

Schickel also named the film one of the Top 10 Movies of 2007, ranking it at #9, calling Daniel Day-Lewis' performance "astonishing", and calling the film "a mesmerizing meditation on the American spirit in all its maddening ambiguities: mean and noble, angry and secretive, hypocritical and more than a little insane in its aspirations." James Christopher, chief film critic for The Times, published a list in April 2008 of his top 100 films, placing There Will Be Blood in second place, behind only Casablanca.

Some critics were positive toward the work but less laudatory, often criticizing its ending. Mick LaSalle of the San Francisco Chronicle, challenged the film's high praise by saying "there should be no need to pretend There Will Be Blood is a masterpiece just because Anderson sincerely tried to make it one" and noting that "the scenes between Day-Lewis and Dano ultimately degenerate into a ridiculous burlesque".

Roger Ebert assigned the film three and a half out of four stars and wrote, "There Will Be Blood is the kind of film that is easily called great. I am not sure of its greatness. It was filmed in the same area of Texas used by No Country for Old Men, and that is a great film, and a perfect one. But There Will Be Blood is not perfect, and in its imperfections (its unbending characters, its lack of women or any reflection of ordinary society, its ending, its relentlessness) we may see its reach exceeding its grasp."

Carla Meyer of the Sacramento Bee, who gave the film the same star rating as Ebert, opined that the final confrontation between Daniel and Eli marked when the work "stops being a masterpiece and becomes a really good movie. What was grand becomes petty, then overwrought." In 2014, Peter Walker of The Guardian likewise argued that the scene "might not be the very worst scene in the history of recent Oscar-garlanded cinema ... but it's perhaps the one most inflated with its own delusional self-importance."

Several months after LaSalle's initial review of the film, he reiterated that while he still did not consider There Will Be Blood to be a masterpiece, he wondered if its "style, an approach, an attitude... might become important in the future." Since 2008, the film has been included in the book 1001 Movies You Must See Before You Die and every revised edition released afterwards. Total Film placed it at number three in their list of the 50 best movies of Total Film lifetime. In The Guardian, journalist Steve Rose ranked it the 17th best arthouse film of all time, and in a separate 2019 ranking a panel of four Guardian journalists ranked it the best film of the 21st century.

Top ten lists 
The film was on the American Film Institute's 10 Movies of the Year; AFI's jury said:

There Will Be Blood is bravura film-making by one of American film's modern masters. Paul Thomas Anderson's epic poem of savagery, optimism and obsession is a true meditation on America.  The film drills down into the dark heart of capitalism, where domination, not gain, is the ultimate goal. In a career defined by transcendent performances, Daniel Day-Lewis creates a character so rich and so towering, that "Daniel Plainview" will haunt the history of film for generations to come.

The film appeared on many critics' top ten lists of the best films of 2007.

 1st – Ethar Alter, Giant
 1st – Marjorie Baumgarten, The Austin Chronicle
 1st – Tom Charity, CNN
 1st – Manohla Dargis, The New York Times
 1st – David Fear, Time Out New York
 1st – Scott Foundas, LA Weekly
 1st – Stephen Holden, The New York Times
 1st – Tod Hill, Staten Island Advance
 1st – Glenn Kenny, Premiere
 1st – Craig Outhier, Orange County Register
 1st – Keith Phipps, The A.V. Club
 1st – Ray Pride, Salon.com
 1st – Mike Russell, The Oregonian
 1st – Hank Sartin, Chicago Reader
 1st – Marc Savlov, The Austin Chronicle
 1st – Mark Slutsky, Montreal Mirror
 1st – Nick Schager, Slant Magazine
 1st – Lisa Schwarzbaum, Entertainment Weekly
 1st – Jan Stuart, Newsday

 1st – Ella Taylor, LA Weekly
 2nd – David Ansen, Newsweek
 2nd – Nathan Rabin, The A.V. Club
 2nd – Rene Rodriguez, The Miami Herald
 2nd – Scott Tobias, The A.V. Club
 3rd – A.O. Scott, The New York Times (tied with Sweeney Todd: The Demon Barber of Fleet Street)
 3rd – Ann Hornaday, The Washington Post
 3rd – Joe Morgenstern, The Wall Street Journal
 4th – Desson Thomson, The Washington Post
 4th – Ty Burr, The Boston Globe
 5th – J. Hoberman, The Village Voice
 5th – Shawn Levy, The Oregonian
 6th – Christy Lemire, Associated Press
 7th – Peter Travers, Rolling Stone
 9th – Claudia Puig, USA Today
 9th – Richard Schickel, TIME magazine
 10th – Lou Lumenick, New York Post
 Top 10 (listed alphabetically, not ranked) – Dana Stevens, Slate

Decade-end lists 
Review aggregator site Metacritic, when comparing over 40 'top ten of the decade' lists from various notable publications, found There Will Be Blood to be the most mentioned, appearing on 46% of critics' lists and being ranked the decade's best film on five of them.

In December 2009, Peter Travers of Rolling Stone chose the film as the #1 film of the decade, saying:
Two years after first seeing There Will Be Blood, I am convinced that Paul Thomas Anderson's profound portrait of an American primitive—take that, Citizen Kane—deserves pride of place among the decade's finest. Daniel Day-Lewis gave the best and ballsiest performance of the past 10 years. As Daniel Plainview, a prospector who loots the land of its natural resources in silver and oil to fill his pockets and gargantuan ego, he showed us a man draining his humanity for power. And Anderson, having extended Plainview's rage from Earth to heaven in the form of a corrupt preacher (Paul Dano), managed to "drink the milkshake" of other risk-taking directors. If I had to stake the future of film in the next decade on one filmmaker, I'd go with PTA. Even more than Boogie Nights and Magnolia—his rebel cries from the 1990s—Blood let Anderson put technology at the service of character. The score by Radiohead's Jonny Greenwood was a sonic explosion that reinvented what film music could be. And the images captured by Robert Elswit, a genius of camera and lighting, made visual poetry out of an oil well consumed by flame. For the final word on Blood, I'll quote Plainview: "It was one goddamn hell of a show."

Chicago Tribune and At the Movies critic Michael Phillips named There Will Be Blood the decade's best film. Phillips stated:
This most eccentric and haunting of modern epics is driven by oilman Daniel Plainview, who, in the hands of actor Daniel Day-Lewis, becomes a Horatio Alger story gone horribly wrong. Writer/director Paul Thomas Anderson's camera is as crucial to the film's hypnotic pull as the performance at its center. For its evocation of the early 1900s, its relentless focus on one man's fascinating obsessions, and for its inspiring example of how to freely adapt a novel—plus, what I think is the performance of the new century—There Will Be Blood stands alone. The more I see it, the sadder, and stranger, and more visually astounding it grows—and the more it seems to say about the best and worst in the American ethos of rugged individualism. Awfully good!

Entertainment Weekly critic Lisa Schwarzbaum named There Will Be Blood the decade's best film as well. In her original review, Schwarzbaum stated:
Anyhow, a fierce story meshing big exterior-oriented themes of American character with an interior-oriented portrait of an impenetrable man (two men, really, including the false prophet Sunday) is only half Anderson's quest, and his exciting achievement. The other half lies in the innovation applied to the telling itself. For a huge picture, There Will Be Blood is exquisitely intimate, almost a collection of sketches. For a long, slow movie, it speeds. For a story set in the fabled bad-old-days past, it's got the terrors of modernity in its DNA. Leaps of romantic chordal grandeur from Brahms' Violin Concerto in D Major announce the launch of a fortune-changing oil well down the road from Eli Sunday's church—and then, much later, announce a kind of end of the world. For bleakness, the movie can't be beat—nor for brilliance.

In December 2009, the website Gawker.com determined that There Will Be Blood is film critics' consensus best film of the decade when aggregating all Best of the Decade lists, stating: "And when the votes were all in, by a nose, There Will Be Blood stood alone at the top of the decade, its straw in the whole damn cinema's milkshake."

The list of critics who lauded There Will Be Blood in their assessments of films from the past decade include:

 The A.V. Club
 The Daily Telegraph
Peter Bradshaw of The Guardian
 Slant Magazine
 Time Out New York
 David Denby, The New Yorker
 Scott Foundas, SF Weekly
 David Germain and Christy Lemire, The Associated Press

 Bill Goodykoontz, The Arizona Republic
 Ann Hornaday, The Washington Post
 Wesley Morris, The Boston Globe
 Michael Phillips, Chicago Tribune
 Lisa Schwarzbaum, Entertainment Weekly
 Dana Stevens, Slate Magazine
 Peter Travers, Rolling Stone
 Chris Vognar, The Dallas Morning News

In 2016, it was voted the #3 best film of the 21st century as picked by 177 film critics from around the world.

The February 2020 issue of New York Magazine lists There Will Be Blood alongside Citizen Kane, Sunset Boulevard, Dr. Strangelove, Butch Cassidy and the Sundance Kid, The Conversation, Nashville, Taxi Driver, The Elephant Man, Pulp Fiction, In the Bedroom, and Roma as "The Best Movies That Lost Best Picture at the Oscars."

Box office performance 
The first public screening of There Will Be Blood was on September 29, 2007, at Fantastic Fest in Austin, Texas. The film was released on December 26, 2007, in New York City and Los Angeles where it grossed US$190,739 on its opening weekend. The film then opened in 885 theaters in selected markets on January 25, 2008, grossing $4.8 million on its opening weekend. The film went on to make $40.2 million in North America and $35.9 million in the rest of the world, with a worldwide total of $76.1 million, well above its $25 million budget; however, the prints and advertising cost for the film's United States release cost about $40 million.

Home media 
The film was released on DVD on April 8, 2008. It was released with one and two-disc editions, both are packaged in a cardboard case. Anderson has refused to record an audio commentary for the film. An HD DVD release was announced, but later canceled due to the discontinuation of the format. A Blu-ray edition was released on June 3, 2008. The film has grossed $23,604,823 through DVD sales.

Accolades

See also 
 List of films featuring the deaf and hard of hearing

Notes

References

External links 

 
 
 
 
 
 

2007 films
American Sign Language films
2007 drama films
American drama films
American epic films
BAFTA winners (films)
Films about cults
Films about deaf people
Films based on American novels
Films distributed by Disney
Films directed by Paul Thomas Anderson
Films featuring a Best Actor Academy Award-winning performance
Films featuring a Best Drama Actor Golden Globe winning performance
Films produced by Scott Rudin
Films set in 1898
Films set in 1902
Films set in 1911
Films set in 1927
Films set in California
Films set in country houses
Films set in New Mexico
Films shot in Texas
Films whose cinematographer won the Best Cinematography Academy Award
Films with screenplays by Paul Thomas Anderson
Films about mining
Petroleum in California
Works about petroleum
Films about curses
Films scored by Jonny Greenwood
Films based on works by Upton Sinclair
Silver Bear for outstanding artistic contribution
Films critical of religion
National Society of Film Critics Award for Best Film winners
Golden Eagle Award (Russia) for Best Foreign Language Film winners
Miramax films
Paramount Vantage films
2000s English-language films
2000s American films
Films about disability